The Gibson Theatre may refer to:

Universal Amphitheatre, am amphitheatre in Los Angeles
Dunbar Theatre (Philadelphia), a theatre in Philadelphia known in the 1920s as the Gibson Theatre